Petrochelidon is a genus of birds known as cliff-nesting swallows. The genus name Petrochelidon is from the Ancient Greek words petros, "rock", and khelidon, "swallow".

The genus includes all of the five species of birds commonly called cliff swallow, and contains the following species:

Species in taxonomic order

References

External links
Petrochelidon at Animal Diversity

 
Hirundinidae
Bird genera